The  is a commuter electric multiple unit (EMU) train type operated by the private railway operator Odakyu Electric Railway in Japan since 1983.

Formation
Trains are formed as 6- and 4-car sets as shown below, with car 1/7 facing the Odawara, Fujisawa or Karakida end and car 6/10 facing the Shinjuku or Katase-Enoshima end. Trains are mostly used in 6+4 car formations.

6-car sets

The M3 and M2 cars each have two single-arm pantographs.

4-car sets

The M1 and M2 cars each have one single-arm pantograph.

Interior
Passenger accommodation consists of seven-person bench seating situated between the doors with blue upholstery, with smaller bench seats that hold up to four at the car ends. Trains refurbished in 2007 have an interior that is similar to that of the 4000 series. Some cars have a jump seat that folds up to provide space for commuters using wheelchairs.

History
Built from 1982, the 8000 series was designed to help the Odakyu Electric Railway deal with the increasing number of passengers they had to carry from suburbs into the Tokyo region. The 8000 series was the last Odakyu trainset to use their distinctive ivory body with blue accents; all future Odakyu commuter trains would use unpainted stainless steel bodies with the same blue accents.

Starting from 2002, the 8000 series would undergo a program of refurbishment. Improvements include replacement of LED screens, new variable-frequency drive systems and replacement of the lozenge-style pantographs to single-arm pantographs among others.

Set 8255, one of the last two remaining field chopper sets, was withdrawn from service in August 2020. It was carried out of Sagami-Ōno depot to a scrapping facility on 27 October 2020.

Accidents and incidents
On 12 August 2013 at about 6:35pm JST, 8000 series set 8261 (operated with set 8058) was struck by lightning. No passengers were hurt as the train was equipped with lightning arresters; however, as a result of the strike, the train was left stalled for about twenty minutes and needed repairs.

On 19 June 2019, set 8264 (operated with set 8064) was severely damaged in a collision with a car stuck at a level crossing between Hon-Atsugi and Aikōishida. Set 8264 was scrapped on 1 April the following year.

References

Electric multiple units of Japan
8000 series
Kawasaki multiple units
Train-related introductions in 1983
1500 V DC multiple units of Japan
Tokyu Car multiple units
Nippon Sharyo multiple units